The Dalriada Hospital is a health facility in Ballycastle, County Antrim, Northern Ireland. It is managed by the Northern Health and Social Care Trust.

History
The facility has its origins in the Ballycastle Union Workhouse which was designed by George Wilkinson and was completed in October 1842. It became Dalriada District Hospital in 1924 and, after joining the National Health Service in 1948, became known as Dalriada Hospital. After the Trust announced the closure of the  multiple sclerosis respite unit at the hospital, campaigners won a reprieve in the High Court in December 2014.

References 

Northern Health and Social Care Trust
Hospitals established in 1842
1842 establishments in Ireland
Health and Social Care (Northern Ireland) hospitals
Hospitals in County Antrim